Leslie Arden is a Canadian musical theatre composer, lyricist and librettist.  She is best known for her work The House of Martin Guerre (co-book by Anna Theresa Cascio) produced by Theatre Plus (1993), the Goodman Theatre (1996) in Chicago and the Canadian Stage Company (1997).

Early life and education
She was born Leslie Arden Jenkins in Beverly Hills, California to Canadian singer Cleone Duncan and her American performer husband, Paul Howard Jenkins.  Her parents moved to Toronto and divorced when she was 6 years old.

Her mother, Cleone Duncan, was a theatre actress who performed many years in the Canadian musical hit Anne of Green Gables – The Musical.

Early in her career she took classes with Lehman Engel, who had been a musical director for over 100 Broadway productions, in Toronto.  In 1990, she was chosen along with 12 other participants to study with musical theatre composer and lyricist Stephen Sondheim at Oxford University.  The sessions were organized by theatre producer Cameron Mackintosh.

Career
Her musical The Boys are Coming Home was part of the American Music Theatre Project at North Western University and was showcased by the National Alliance of Musical Theatre in New York City. Theatre critic Richard Ouzanian says she is "the creator of some of the most sophisticated work on our stages". The Toronto Star has commented that her work is "beautifully crafted" and USA Today states she is a "major talent".  She also wrote the Chalmers Award-winning The Happy Prince.  She collaborated with Canadian playwright Norm Foster for the musicals The Last Resort and Ned Durango.

Works
A Meeting of Minds
Feathers on the Page
Ned Durango
One Step Forward (formerly The Boys are Coming Home)
The Greatest Gift
The Happy Prince
The House of Martin Guerre
The Last Resort
The Princess and the Handmaiden
Harvest Moon Rising
Moll
The Gift of the Magi

References

Year of birth missing (living people)
20th-century Canadian dramatists and playwrights
20th-century Canadian women writers
21st-century Canadian dramatists and playwrights
21st-century Canadian women writers
Canadian musical theatre composers
Canadian women dramatists and playwrights
Women musical theatre composers
Living people
Canadian women composers
Canadian lesbian musicians
21st-century Canadian LGBT people
20th-century Canadian LGBT people